Bogumil Jewsiewicki (born 1942 in Vilnius, also first name Bogumił and last names Koss, Koss Jewsiewicki, Jewsiewicki-Koss, and Jewsiewicki Koss) is a retired professor of history and an Africanist at Université Laval specialising in the history of Central Africa, notably the Democratic Republic of the Congo, and the social usage of visual memory.

Jewsiewicki obtained a Master's degree in ethnography in 1964 and a PhD in 1968, both at the University of Łódź. He then emigrated to Canada to work at Université de Saint-Boniface in Winnipeg and in the Département d’histoire of Université Laval since 1977, becoming a full professor in Histoire comparée de la mémoire (comparative history of memory) in 1985.

Jewsiewicki was a researcher at the Centre d'études africaines of the School for Advanced Studies in the Social Sciences in Paris, and curated exhibitions on Congolese popular urban painting and on photography at the Museum for African Art in New York (1998-1999) and at the Museum für Völkerkunde in Vienna. In 2009, he retired from his teaching post and continued as a researcher and member of the Centre interuniversitaire de recherche sur les lettres, les arts et les traditions (CÉLAT, fr) at Université Laval. 
Jewsiewicki was the recipient of the 2006 Distinguished Africanist Award of the African Studies Association, and in 2007 he won Marius Barbeau Medal from the Association canadienne d’ethnologie et de folklore (Folklore Studies Association of Canada, ACEF FSAC). Jewsiewicki's collection of popular Congolese paintings was acquired by the Royal Museum for Central Africa at Tervuren, Belgium.

Publications
Jewsiewicki published many scholarly articles, books and book chapters, including:
 Marx, Afrique et Occident : les pratiques africanistes de l'histoire marxiste, Centre for Developing-Area Studies, McGill University, [Montréal], 1985. .
 with David S. Newbury: African historiographies : what history for which Africa?, SAGE Publications, Beverly Hills, 1986. Series: Sage series on African modernization and development.
 Art pictural zaïrois. Sillery, Quebec City: Septentrion en collab. avec le CÉLAT (Centre interuniversitaire de recherche sur les lettres, les arts et les traditions), 1992. .
 with V. Y. Mudimbe: Africans' Memories and Contemporary History of Africa, History and Theory 32(1993), Beiheft 32: History Making in Africa. pp. 1–11
 with Elikia M'Bokolo, Ndaywel è Nziem and Sabakinu Kivilu: Naître et mourir au Zaïre : un demi-siècle d'histoire au quotidien, Paris : Éditions Karthala, 1993. .
 with Jocelyn Létourneau: L'histoire en partage : usages et mises en discours du passé.  Paris : L'Harmattan, 1996. .
 with Jocelyn Létourneau: Identités en mutation, socialités en germination, Septentrion, Sillery, Québec, 1998. Series: Nouveaux cahiers du CELAT.
 Mami Wata : ma peinture urbaine au Congo. Paris : Ed. Gallimard, 2003. .
 with Léonard N'Sanda Buleli: Les identités régionales en Afrique centrale : constructions et dérives, Paris : L'Harmattan, 2008. .
 Introduction. One Historiography or Several? A Requiem for Africanism, in: I. Ndaywel è Nziem, M. Elisabeth Mudimbe-boyi, Pierre Nora (Eds.): Images, mémoires et savoirs : une histoire en partage avec Bogumil Koss Jewsiewicki, Karthala, Paris, 2009. Series: Hommes et sociétés. ISBN 9782811102081, 2811102086.
 In the empire of forgetting : collective memory of the slave trade and slavery, in: Ana Lucia Araujo, Mariana P. Candido, Paul E. Lovejoy (Eds.): Crossing Memories: Slavery and African Diaspora, Africa World Press, Trenton, NJ, 2011.
 with Freddy Tsimba, Koli Jean Bofane, Pascal Blanchard, and Henry Bundjoko: Freddy Tsimba - Mabele eleki lola! : de aarde, stralender dan het paradijs, Musée Royal de l'Afrique Centrale. Exhibition catalogue Africamuseum, Tervuren, Belgium. Kate' art édition, Brussel, 2020.

Books honouring Jewsiewicki's work are:
 I. Ndaywel è Nziem, M. Elisabeth Mudimbe-boyi, Pierre Nora (Eds.): Images, mémoires et savoirs : une histoire en partage avec Bogumil Koss Jewsiewicki, Karthala, Paris, 2009. Series: Hommes et sociétés. ISBN 9782811102081, 2811102086.
 Ana Lucia Araujo, Mariana P. Candido, Paul E. Lovejoy (Eds.): Crossing Memories: Slavery and African Diaspora'', Africa World Press, Trenton, NJ, 2011. Series: Harriet Tubman series on the African diaspora. Papers presented at a conference held in Quebec City in 2005.

External links
   Total duration 3h 24m 15s. Université Laval, Faculté des sciences sociales, Département d'anthropologie. Jewsiewicki discusses his career as a historian of Africa and collector of African art. In French.
 . Video. Benjamin Hebblethwaite. Jewsiewicki lectures on Congolese culture at the Conference "Kongo Atlantic Dialogues: Kongo Culture in Central Africa And In The Americas", University of Florida. Duration 13m 21s. February 2014. In French.

References

1942 births
Canadian Africanists
Living people
Polish Africanists
Scientists from Vilnius
Academic staff of Université Laval
University of Łódź alumni
Historians of the Democratic Republic of the Congo
Academic staff of the National University of Zaire
Lovanium University people
Polish emigrants to Canada
Canadian art collectors
Polish art collectors